Garrett Lincoln Henzman (born July 4, 1995) is an American professional baseball pitcher in the Chicago White Sox organization.

Amateur career
Henzman attended Lexington Christian Academy in Lexington, Kentucky, and played for the school's baseball team. He underwent Tommy John surgery during his junior year. After he graduated, he enrolled at the University of Louisville to play college baseball for the Louisville Cardinals. He was named a Freshman All-American by Louisville Slugger. Eligible for the Major League Baseball draft after his sophomore year, the Seattle Mariners selected him in the 31st round of the 2016 MLB draft. After the 2016 season, he played collegiate summer baseball with the Chatham Anglers of the Cape Cod Baseball League. He returned to Louisville in 2017, and served as their closer Henzman won the Stopper of the Year Award.

Professional career
The Chicago White Sox selected Henzman in the fourth round, with the 117th overall selection, of the 2017 MLB draft. Henzman signed with the White Sox. Since turning professional, he has been utilized primarily as a starter rather than as a reliever. He made his professional debut with the Arizona League White Sox. After one scoreless appearance, he was promoted to the Great Falls Voyagers and spent the remainder of the season there, going 0-3 with a 4.00 ERA in 27 innings. In 2018, he opened the season pitching for the Kannapolis Intimidators of the Class A South Atlantic League and was then promoted to the Winston-Salem Dash of the Class A Advanced Carolina League. In 27 games (22 starts) between the two clubs, he pitched to a 6-4 record with a 2.35 ERA. Henzman returned to Winston-Salem to begin 2019. After pitching in nine games for Winston-Salem, he was promoted to the Birmingham Barons. Over 24 starts between the two clubs, he went 7-8 with a 5.24 ERA.

References

External links

Living people
1995 births
Baseball players from Lexington, Kentucky
Baseball pitchers
Louisville Cardinals baseball players
Chatham Anglers players
Arizona League White Sox players
Great Falls Voyagers players
Kannapolis Intimidators players
Winston-Salem Dash players
Birmingham Barons players